The women's 60 metres competition at the 2010 IAAF World Indoor Championships was held at the ASPIRE Dome on 12 and 14 March.

The race was expected to be a duel between LaVerne Jones-Ferrette and Carmelita Jeter who had run some of the fastest times for many seasons at 6.97 and 7.02 seconds, respectively. In the first round of competition Myriam Soumaré was the surprise winner of the first heat, Jones-Ferrette clocked the fastest of the day in her heat with 7.14 seconds, while Veronica Campbell-Brown and Jeter topped their qualifiers comfortably. Ruddy Zang Milama of Gabon was another surprise in the final heat as she beat the more experienced Sheri-Ann Brooks and Mikele Barber.

On the second day of competition, Campbell-Brown placed herself in contention for a medal with a 7.07 second run in the first semi-final, although Jones-Ferrette's time in the second semi was faster still. Brooks ran a personal best to beat Jeter in the last semi-final of the day. Among the other qualifiers, Zang Milama surprised further with 7.13-second national record to become the first Gabonese athlete to reach an indoor final in any event. Barber and reigning European 60 m champion Yevgeniya Polyakova were among the casualties of the round.

In the final, Campbell-Brown ran a personal best of 7.00 seconds – the fastest winning time for 11 year – to upset the pre-race favourites. Finishing just after in 7.03 seconds, Jones-Ferrette settled for silver – the first global athletics medal for the United States Virgin Islands. Jeter rounded out the top three with a run of 7.05 seconds, continuing her bronze medal run from the World Championships in Athletics. Zang Milama and Brooks shared fourth place having made significant career progressions over the distance. Chandra Sturrup's sixth-place finish was notable in that, at the age of 38 years, she was almost a decade older than the next oldest athlete to reach the final (Jeter).

Jones-Ferrette was later disqualified due to a doping infraction and banned for six months. The positions and medals were redistributed, with Jeter receiving the silver and Zang Milama taking the bronze medal.

Medalists

Records

Qualification standards

Schedule

Results

Heats

Qualification: First 4 in each heat (Q) and the next 4 fastest (q) advance to the semifinals.

Semifinals

Qualification: First 2 in each heat (Q) and the next 2 fastest (q) advance to the final.

Final

References

Official reports
Heats Results
Semifinals Results
Final Result

60 metres
60 metres at the World Athletics Indoor Championships
2010 in women's athletics